The Ministry of Health and Welfare (MOHW previously MW) is a branch of the government of South Korea. The headquarters is in Sejong City. Previously the headquarters were on floors 6 through 12 of the Hyundai Building in Jongno District, Seoul, when they were the Ministry for Health, Welfare and Family Affairs.

Developments 

On December 23, 1994, the Ministry of Health and Social Affairs (보건사회부) changed their name to Ministry of Health and Welfare. On February 29, 2008, the ministry merged the National Youth Commission, Prime Minister's Office of Korea, the Family Affairs from Ministry of Gender Equality and Family and Centre on Measures for Bipolarization and Livelihood, Ministry of Planning and Budget to become the Ministry for Health, Welfare and Family Affairs (보건복지가족부).

However, on March 19, 2010, the Ministry was reorganized to become the Ministry of Health and Welfare while transferring their responsibilities of overseeing youth and family affairs to Ministry of Gender Equality and Family. However, the Ministry of Health and Welfare still governs Children's affairs.

With the lessons learned from the COVID-19 pandemic, the legislation has been introduced and passed to expand one of its child agencies, Korea Centers for Disease Control and Prevention, into Korea Disease Control and Prevention Administration and to equip the Ministry with two Vice-Ministers - one responsible for welfare and the other public health. These changes will come to effect on 12 September 2020.

Work 
The main tasks include health care and quarantine, compulsory administration, pharmacist administration, health insurance, basic living insurance, welfare support, social security and social service policies, and population policy to cope with low birth rate and aging child welfare.

Organisation 

 Headquarter
 Minister and Vice Minister
 4 Offices and 20 Bureaus 
 Child Agencies
 National Hospitals  
Bugok
Chuncheon
Gongju
Masan
Mokpo
Naju
Sorokdo
 National Center for Mental Health in Seoul
National Rehabilitation Center in Seoul
National Cemetery for Overseas Koreans in Cheonan
Health Insurance Dispute Conciliation Commission in Seoul
Centers for Disease Control and Prevention in Cheongju
Osong Biovalley Support Center in Cheongju
Overseeing Public Institutions
Foundations
Korea Foundation for International Healthcare (KOFIH) in Seoul
Osong Medical Innovation Foundation in Cheongju
Daegu-Gyeongbuk Medical Innovation Foundation (DGMIF) in Daegu
Research Institutes
Korea Health Industry Development Institute (KHIDI) in Cheongju
Korea Labor Force Development Institute for the Aged in Goyang
Korea Human Resource Development Institute for Health and Welfare (KOHI) in Cheongju
National Cancer Center (NCC) in Goyang
Korea Health Personnel Licensing Examination Institute in Seoul
Korea Disabled People's Development Institute (KODDI) in Seoul
Korea Children Promotion Institute (KCPI) in Seoul
Korea Health Promotion Institute in Seoul
National Evidence-based Healthcare Collaborating Agency (NECA) in Seoul
National Institute for Korean Medicine Development (NIKOM) in Gyeongsan
Korea National Institute for Bioethics Policy (KONIBP) in Seoul
Service Providers 
National Pension Service (NPS) in Jeonju
National Health Insurance Service (NHIS) in Wonju
Health Insurance Review and Assessment Service (HIRA) in Wonju
Social Security Information Service (SSIS) in Seoul
Korean Red Cross in Seoul
National Medical Center (NMC) in Seoul
Korea National Council on Social Welfare (Social Security Network; SSN) in Seoul
Korea Medical Dispute Mediation and Arbitration Agency (K-Medi) in Seoul
Korea Organ Donation Agency (KODA) in Seoul
Korea Institute for Healthcare Accreditation (KOIHA) in Seoul
Korea Public Tissue Bank (KPTB) in Seoul

References

External links

 
 

Medical and health organizations based in South Korea
Health
South Korea
Public health organizations
South Korea